Johannes Goth is a 1920 German silent film directed by Karl Gerhardt and starring Ernst Stahl-Nachbaur,  Carola Toelle, and Werner Krauss.

The art direction was by Franz Seemann.

Cast

References

Bibliography

External links

1920 films
Films of the Weimar Republic
Films directed by Karl Gerhardt
German silent feature films
Films with screenplays by Carl Mayer
Films produced by Erich Pommer
German black-and-white films